Shigeta (written: 重田) is a Japanese surname. Notable people with the surname include:

James Shigeta (1929–2014), American actor
Harry K. Shigeta (1877–1963), Japanese American photographer
, Japanese footballer

Japanese-language surnames